Ivan Mirković (born 25 March 1987) is a former Serbian footballer who played as a midfielder.

Career

Youth and amateur
Mirković played four years of college soccer, two years at Oxnard College and two years at Fresno Pacific University. During his time at Fresno Pacific University, Mirkovic earned third-team all-PacWest honors as a defender, named NCCAA Tournament Defensive MVP and named to NCCAA All-West Region team as a defender in 2012. In 2013, Mirkovic was named the PacWestDefender of the Year in November and was selected to the All-Pac West Conference First Team. Mirkovic was also honored to the NSCAA (National Soccer Coaches Association of America) All-West Region team.

In 2011 through 2013, Mirković also played for Ventura County Fusion in the USL PDL.

Professional
Mirković signed his first professional contract in March 2014, joining USL Pro club Sacramento Republic. After winning the USL Pro title, Ivan Mirkovic was re-signed on a new contract. On 1 April, Ivan Mirkovic was transferred to Orange County SC. The terms of the transaction have not been disclosed.

On 10 November 2016 Saint Louis FC has come to terms with midfielder Ivan Mirkovic and goalkeeper Devala Gorrick, pending USL and the United States Soccer Federation approval.

Mirkovic joined Tulsa Roughnecks for the 2018 season on February 2, 2018 on undisclosed transfer fee.

On 24 January 2019 Fresno FC announced new additions to coaching staff for 2019 adding Ivan Mirkovic as a player/coach, who will also assisting as head of analysis.

References

1987 births
Living people
Serbian footballers
Serbian expatriate footballers
Oxnard College alumni
Ventura County Fusion players
Sacramento Republic FC players
Orange County SC players
Saint Louis FC players
FC Tulsa players
Association football midfielders
Expatriate soccer players in the United States
USL League Two players
USL Championship players
Fresno Pacific University alumni